Volucella evecta, the eastern swiftwing, is an uncommon species of hoverfly that has been considered a subspecies of Volucella bombylans, but has been shown to be a distinct species. This species is a bumblebee mimic. It resembles a number of species, including Bombus pensylvanicus, Bombus affinis,  Bombus  bimaculatus, and Habropoda laboriosa.   The range of this species is from Eastern North America and Canada from Georgia to New Brunswick. The adults have been observed feeding on Geum, Viburnum, Rubus, and other flowering plants. Larvae of this species are not known, but larvae in this genus feed on the debris and larvae in bee and wasp nests.

Description
For terms see Morphology of Diptera.

Size

Head
The frons is  black with yellow pile The face is black to chestnut with yellow pile. In profile, the face is excavated below the antennae. The antennae has an elongate dark red flagellum with long densly plumose arista. The eyes are pilose with eyes contiguous in the male.
Thorax
The scutum is black and entirely covered with yellow pile. The scutellum is yellow with yellow pile. The pleura are yellow pilose anteriorly.
Wings
The marginal cell is closed. The anterior cross-vein M1 curves basally wings with a dark brown spot
Legs
The legs are black with black pile.
Abdomen
The abdomen is black with black pile except the second segment, which is covered with yellow pile.

References

Volucella
Diptera of North America
Hoverflies of North America
Insects described in 1852
Taxa named by Francis Walker (entomologist)